Attentat or Atentat may refer to:

 Attentat (band), Swedish punk band 
 Attentat (novel), a 1997 novel by Amélie Nothomb
 Atentát, a 1964 Czech film directed by Jiří Sequens
Atentat, Ukrainian-language title of the 1995 Ukrainian film  about the murder of Stepan Bandera